Ann Hibner Koblitz (born 1952) is a Professor Emerita of Women and Gender Studies at Arizona State University known for her studies of the history of women in science.  She is the Director of the Kovalevskaia Fund, which supports women in science in developing countries.

Education and career
She received her B.A. in history of science from Princeton University, where she was in the first class of women admitted as undergraduates.  She earned her Ph.D. in history from Boston University.  She studied and did research in the Soviet Union in 1974–75, 1978, 1981–82, 1985, and 1986.  In 1984–85 she was a member of the Institute for Advanced Study in Princeton, after which she had temporary teaching positions at Wellesley College, Oregon State University, and the University of Puget Sound.  From 1989 to 1998 she taught at Hartwick College in Oneonta, New York.  Since 1998 she has been a professor at Arizona State University.

Controversies
In a graduate seminar in 1977 Ann Hibner Koblitz criticized an article by political scientist Samuel Huntington for misusing mathematics in an attempt to buttress his arguments.  This led her husband Neal Koblitz to include her critique in an article he wrote on "Mathematics as Propaganda," and this in turn inspired Yale mathematician Serge Lang to lead a campaign against the election of Huntington to the National Academy of Sciences.  The journalist Charles Sykes, who describes the episode in detail in his book Profscam, writes that

Despite the vigorous defense of Huntington by Nobel Prize winning economist Herbert Simon, Lang's campaign was successful, and Huntington was twice voted down by the Academy's members.

In the 1980s and 1990s Koblitz was a critic of the gender essentialism of Evelyn Fox Keller, who maintained that modern science is inherently patriarchal and ill-suited for women.  Koblitz argued that Keller failed to appreciate the multi-faceted nature of scientific research and the great diversity of experiences of women across cultures and time periods.  For example, in the 19th century the first women to earn advanced university degrees in Europe in any field were almost all in the natural sciences and medicine. In an article about the first 20 years of the Association for Women in Mathematics (AWM), the mathematician and former AWM president Lenore Blum wrote

In the 1990s and early 2000s a group of archaeologists, led by Steven A. LeBlanc of Harvard, popularized the notion that warfare was endemic among all prehistoric peoples. Koblitz analyzed the writings of this group, compared them to other sources, and concluded that the claim of pervasive warfare among the ancient Hohokam people of present-day central Arizona is a modern "masculinist narrative" that has little support in the archaeological record. After speaking at the Old Pueblo Archaeology Center near Tucson, Arizona, Koblitz was asked to write a version of her Men and Masculinities article for the Center's Bulletin.  In that article she wrote:

Philanthropy
In 1985 Koblitz and her husband Neal established the Kovalevskaia Fund as a nonprofit organization whose purpose is to support and encourage women in developing countries in science, mathematics, engineering, and medicine.  It was originally aimed at promoting women in the sciences in Vietnam; it grew out of Ann's work on the history of women and science, her and Neal's experience in the opposition to United States involvement in the Vietnam War, and their efforts to help promote science in Vietnam afterwards. Grants were at first made solely in Vietnam, but were eventually extended to other developing countries.

Selected works
Books
 
 
 

Selected journal publications

Honors
 In 1985, Koblitz was invited to give the Kenneth O. May Lecture on the History of Mathematics at the University of Toronto.
 In 1990, Koblitz won the History of Science Society's Margaret W. Rossiter History of Women in Science Prize for her article "Science, Women, and the Russian Intelligentsia: The Generation of the 1860s" that appeared in the Society's journal Isis in 1988.
 In 1995, Koblitz received an honorary doctorate from Saint Mary-of-the-Woods College in Indiana.
 In 2010, the Government of Vietnam conferred a President's Friendship Medal on her.
 In 2015, Koblitz won the "Transdisciplinary Book Award" of the Arizona State University Institute for Humanities Research for her book Sex and Herbs and Birth Control: Women and Fertility Regulation Through the Ages.

References

1952 births
American women academics
20th-century American historians
Arizona State University faculty
Living people
People from Jersey City, New Jersey
21st-century American historians
American women historians
Princeton University alumni
Boston University College of Arts and Sciences alumni
Institute for Advanced Study people
Wellesley College faculty
Oregon State University faculty
University of Puget Sound faculty
Hartwick College faculty
21st-century American women writers
20th-century American women writers
Historians from New Jersey